Charlene Fernandez (née Ramos; born February 24, 1955) is an American politician who was the Democratic leader of the Arizona House of Representatives from 2019 to 2021. She was first elected to the state House in 2014 and represents Southwestern Arizona, specifically, the majority of Yuma County, western Pima County, southwestern Maricopa County and southwestern Pinal County. She resigned on November 15, 2021 to take a position at the U.S. Department of Agriculture. Her son Brian Fernandez was appointed by the Yuma County, Arizona Board of Supervisors to succeed her in the Arizona House of Representatives.

Early life and education
Fernandez was born in Yuma, Arizona to the late Antonio "Tony" Ramos and Carmen Ramos. She attended Yuma High School where she graduated, and went on to attend Arizona Western College before transferring to Northern Arizona University earning a Bachelor of Science degree in education.

Career
Fernandez worked for Congressman Ed Pastor for twelve years, coordinating constituent services for the western portion of then Congressional District 2. While working for Congressman Pastor, Charlene spearheaded an effort that culminated in bringing a Veteran's Administration clinic to Yuma County for the first time in history; previously the Phoenix Veterans facility was the closest place for them to receive these services. Her experience led to her becoming a consultant for a software company that produced a Constituent Management System for the U.S. House of Representatives.

Charlene later served Governor Janet Napolitano as a liaison for the Arizona Department of Environment Quality in Yuma County. In this capacity she worked with the U.S. Environmental Protection Agency, as well as its counterpart in the Republic of Mexico, to ensure that the air and water in Southwestern Arizona remained safe while ensuring that businesses faced minimal impact.

Political career

Arizona House Democratic Leader

Fernandez was elected Democratic Leader on November 8, 2018. The Arizona House Democrats defeated four Republican incumbents to bring the chamber to a 31-29 Republican majority, the smallest it's been since the 1960s.

Arizona House of Representatives
In 2012, Fernandez ran for the Arizona State House from the newly drawn 4th Legislative District. Fernandez ultimately lost in the August primary by 140 votes to Juan Carlos Escamilla. Escamilla went on to win the general election.

In May 2014, Fernandez announced her candidacy for the seat again. She won the August primary by a margin of 12.8%. The general election was unexpectedly competitive, Republican Richard Hopkins led Fernandez on election night as the heavily Republican portion of the district reported early. The next four days saw the margins go up and down, by the fifth day, with the Democratic strongholds in Pima and Yuma counties reporting, Fernandez was declared the victor by 188 votes.

In 2016, Fernandez successfully ran for re-election; she was unopposed in the general election.

In 2018, Fernandez successfully ran for re-election. She resigned on November 15, 2021 to take a position at the U.S. Department of Agriculture.

Vice Chair of the Arizona Democratic Party
In 2008, Fernandez was elected by the Arizona Democratic State Committee to be First Vice Chair of the Arizona Democratic Party, she served in this capacity until 2009.

Yuma Union High School Board
Fernandez was elected to the Yuma Union High School District Governing Board, serving as both President and Vice President.

Arizona Legislative Career

Leadership

Fernandez served as the House Democratic Leader, the highest ranking Democratic member, previously having served as the House Democratic Whip.

Committee on Appropriations
In 2014, Fernandez was appointed to the coveted Committee on Appropriations, she also serves on the newly created Subcommittee on Public Safety, Infrastructure, and Resources.
 Committee on Appropriations
 Appropriations Subcommittee on Public Safety, Infrastructure, and Resources

Education

Fernandez has been very supportive of the #RedforEd movement. Speaking to reporters she called public education, "The great equalizer."

Fernandez has worked with Save Our Schools Arizona, a grassroots organization collecting signatures to refer SB1431, the ESA voucher expansion bill, to the 2018 Arizona ballot, encouraging a "No" vote. Proponents believe that SB1431 takes money away from public schools and gives it to private schools with little to no accountability and our seeking its repeal.

In 2016, Fernandez was name Legislator of Year by the Arizona Parent Teacher Association.

The Arizona Republic published a guest editorial by Fernandez in September 2015 entitled, "How I'd reform private school tax credits." In it Fernandez details her views about Arizona education funding in general and private school tuition tax credits in particular.

Fernandez was supportive of the RedForEd Teacher Walkout. Speaking to the media about the importance of treating educators fairly.

Volkswagen settlement
Fernandez supports using money from the Volkswagen emissions settlement for clean energy buses. She has argued that children are required to be in and around these buses on a daily basis and utilizing the settlement to help protect them from the harmful emissions would be a just use of the funds.

Gun laws
Fernandez has been a supporter of stricter gun control. She has been criticized for recognizing students visiting the capitol advocating for such measures.

Sexual harassment reporting
Fernandez fought her Republican colleagues who sought to limit the ability of sexual harassment and assault victims to report. Stating that, "We're blaming people."

LGBTQ
Fernandez has been an outspoken advocate of LGBT issues and helped form the Arizona State Legislature's LGBT Caucus.

Minimum wage
Fernandez was a supporter of the successful Proposition 206 which raised Arizona's minimum wage.

Environment
Fernandez called on Senator Jeff Flake to support higher ozone standards. She said, "When children have asthma, if your child stays home from school, mom and dad usually have to stay home with that child, and we're talking about productivity. If mom or dad have to take that child to urgent care, if they don't have insurance—that's dollars and cents.  So this affects all of us."

Criminal justice
Fernandez has opposed the private prison system in Arizona supported by Governor Doug Ducey. She has challenged the governor's staff from her seat on the Appropriations Committee to justify the need to provide more prison beds.

2016 presidential endorsement
Fernandez was one of the earliest to endorse Hillary Clinton for United States President. She was elected as a delegate to the Democratic National Convention in Philadelphia.

2016 election lawsuit
Fernandez filed a declaration in support of a Plaintiffs' Motion for a preliminary injunction against the impact of HB 2023. The law, which criminalizes the activities of citizens seeking to assist those in returning early ballots who otherwise may not is still being litigated in the courts. Fernandez wrote, "The collection and personal delivery of early ballots is particularly crucial among my constituency. In areas like mine that are very rural, many voters lack home mail delivery and can have trouble receiving and mailing their early ballots.” At least one county election official, Helen Purcell, a Republican from Maricopa County, chose to not enforce the law saying, "We are not the police."

Personal life
Fernandez serves or has served on the Yuma Community Foundation, Board of the United Way of Yuma County, and Yuma Leadership.

Fernandez and her husband Sergio have three adult children.

Electoral history

Non-partisan elections

References

External links
 

1955 births
21st-century American politicians
21st-century American women politicians
Hispanic and Latino American state legislators in Arizona
Hispanic and Latino American women in politics
Living people
Democratic Party members of the Arizona House of Representatives
Northern Arizona University alumni
People from Yuma, Arizona
Women state legislators in Arizona